Tad Gormley Stadium (originally City Park Stadium) is a 26,500 seat multi-purpose outdoor stadium, located in City Park, in New Orleans, Louisiana.

The stadium is home to the University of New Orleans Privateers men's and women's track and field teams. The Tulane University Green Wave men's and women's track and field teams also host track meets at the stadium. The Xavier University men's and women's track and field teams also use the stadium as its home venue. It is also frequently used for Louisiana High School Athletic Association football games, soccer matches and track and field meets.

The stadium features GameDay Grass MT from AstroTurf, a 400-meter all-weather track, three locker rooms, a press box seating 110, and press suite seating for 40.

History
Tad Gormley Stadium was built by the Works Progress Administration (WPA) during the Great Depression and completed in 1937. It has been used for baseball, football, soccer, and track and field.

In 1957, the stadium was renamed Tad Gormley Stadium in honor of athletic trainer and coach Frank "Tad" Gormley.

In 2005, Hurricane Katrina flooded the stadium, along with parts of New Orleans. It remained structurally sound, but required major repairs to the electrical and plumbing systems along with the playing field. In 2006, running back Reggie Bush was drafted by the New Orleans Saints. He donated over $80,000 to repair the playing field. In acknowledgement of his generosity, Tad Gormley Stadium's playing field was renamed Reggie Bush Field.

Sports

Football
In its early years, the stadium would host high school football games in front of sellout crowds with standing-room only crowds surrounding the playing field. The record for attendance was set in 1940 when 34,345 spectators attended a game between Jesuit High School of New Orleans and Holy Cross High School of New Orleans.

The stadium has also hosted Louisiana High School Athletic Association (LHSAA) state championship football games. The last Class AAAA championship game (largest classification until 1991) held in the stadium was on December 10, 1971 when Brother Martin High School defeated New Orleans Catholic League rival St. Augustine High School 23–0 in front of 25,000. The last title game in the facility was in 1975, when John Curtis High School defeated Notre Dame High School of Crowley 13–12 for the Class AA title.

The University of New Orleans Privateers' club football team played in the stadium from 1965 to 1968 and again from 2008 to 2011. The Tulane Green Wave football team played four homecoming games and one non-conference game at the stadium in 2002, 2003, 2004 and 2008.

After Hurricane Katrina, the first event held at the newly renovated stadium was an LHSAA high school prep-football game on September 21, 2006 pitting Brother Martin High School versus L. W. Higgins High School.

Baseball
The stadium was home to the New Orleans Pelicans (baseball) team from 1958 to 1959, after the closing of Pelican Stadium in 1957. On April 6, 1969, the New York Mets and Minnesota Twins played a doubleheader at the stadium.

Soccer
On March 28, 1982 the stadium hosted a World Cup tune-up match for the Honduras National Team against the Tampa Bay Rowdies of the North American Soccer League. The match ended in a 1–1 draw.

The New Orleans Riverboat Gamblers of the USL A-League played in the stadium from 1996 to 1997. On March 25, 2007, C.D. Olimpia played the New England Revolution in an international friendly at Gormley Stadium. In 2008, Tad Gormley hosted select New Orleans Shell Shockers (later renamed New Orleans Jesters) home soccer matches.

The stadium hosted another international friendly match on February 4, 2012 between Major League Soccer's Chicago Fire Soccer Club and Honduran soccer club Real C.D. España.

The U.S. Soccer Women's national team played the Brazil Women's national team at Tad Gormley Stadium on July 13, 2003 in New Orleans, Louisiana. The U.S. defeated Brazil 1-0.

Track and field
Tad Gormley played host to the 1992 U.S. Olympic Track and Field Trials for the 1992 Summer Olympic games held in Barcelona, Spain. The stadium hosted the 1998 USA Outdoor Track and Field Championships.

Special events

Concerts
Tad Gormley Stadium has also hosted concerts by many famous artists, including Alice Cooper, The Beatles, Eric Clapton, Journey, Pearl Jam, Rage Against the Machine, Ramones, The Rolling Stones and ZZ Top among others.

Gallery

See also
 City Park (New Orleans)
 Louisiana High School Athletic Association
 New Orleans Privateers
 New Orleans Pelicans (baseball)
 List of soccer stadiums in the United States
 List of music venues

References

External links

 New Orleans City Park
 UNO Privateers Athletics

American football venues in New Orleans
Athletics (track and field) venues in New Orleans
Baseball venues in New Orleans
Buildings and structures in New Orleans
College football venues
College track and field venues in the United States
Defunct baseball venues in the United States
Defunct minor league baseball venues
High school football venues in Louisiana
Music venues in Louisiana
New Orleans Jesters
New Orleans Pelicans (baseball) stadiums
New Orleans Privateers
New Orleans Privateers football
Soccer venues in New Orleans
Tulane Green Wave football venues
Tulane Green Wave sports venues
Works Progress Administration in Louisiana
Xavier Gold Rush and Gold Nuggets
1937 establishments in Louisiana
Sports venues completed in 1937